The 2017 CONCACAF Gold Cup qualification (CFU–UNCAF play-off) was a home-and-away two-legged qualification play-off that took place in March 2017 to determine the final team that would participate in the 2017 CONCACAF Gold Cup. It was the second edition of the competition.

The Caribbean Football Union (CFU) representative, Haiti, met the Central American Football Union (UNCAF) representative, Nicaragua, in the play-off.

The matches took place on 24 and 28 March 2017, as it was the only international window on the FIFA International Match Calendar that occurred after the 2017 Copa Centroamericana and 2016 Caribbean Cup fifth place playoff had finished but before the 2017 CONCACAF Gold Cup was scheduled to begin. CONCACAF conducted a draw to determine the order of matches, at the CONCACAF Headquarters in Miami Beach, Florida, on 3 February 2017, 12:00 EST (UTC−5).

Nicaragua overcame a 3–1 first leg deficit to defeat Haiti 3–0 in the second leg and win the play-off 4–3 on aggregate, qualifying for their second appearance in the Gold Cup and their first since 2009.

Qualified teams

Matches
If tied on aggregate, away goals were the first tie-breaker.

First leg

Second leg

Nicaragua won 4–3 on aggregate and qualified for the 2017 CONCACAF Gold Cup.

References

External links
CONCACAF Gold Cup , CONCACAF.com

2017
Central American Football Union competitions
Caribbean Football Union
Qualification play-off
2016–17 in CONCACAF football
2016–17 in Nicaraguan football
Nicaragua national football team matches
Haiti national football team matches
March 2017 sports events in North America